Park Chang-Heon (Hangul: 박창헌; born 12 December 1985) is a South Korean football player.

External links 

1985 births
Living people
South Korean footballers
Incheon United FC players
Gyeongnam FC players
K League 1 players
Association football midfielders